Outfit7 is a Slovenian multinational video game developer, best known as the creator of the Talking Tom & Friends app and media franchise. The company was founded by Samo and Iza Login. The company operates in 7 studios worldwide and almost exclusively focuses on mobile games related to the Talking Tom & Friends franchise. In January 2017, the company was acquired by United Luck Consortium and then sold to Zhejiang Jinke for over $USD 1 billion. The company also owns HyperDot Studios.

History

Founding and early years 
Outfit7 was founded by Samo and Iza Sia Login, who had studied computer science in college and wanted to get into the mobile app business following the debut of the Apple App Store. In 2009, they invested  $250,000 (€180,000) with six friends and set up on office in Ljubljana, Slovenia, where they developed some apps. Their first few attempts – a soccer app, a travel guide to Iceland and a "wealth affirmation app" were unsuccessful. After six months of attempts, Iza Sia and Samo developed a children's app called Talking Tom Cat, in which an animated cat named Tom would repeat in a "high-pitched helium squeak whatever is spoken into an iPhone’s microphone" along with other reactions to feeding and petting.

Talking Tom & Friends 

The Talking Tom & Friends franchise was created with the launch of the Talking Tom Cat app. It focused on anthropomorphic cats and dogs repeating things said to it by the user, before shifting focus to other apps such as endless-runner games, virtual pet games and the like.

The franchise reached 300 million downloads 19 months after its launch. The app franchise then went on to hit one billion downloads in June 2013. Talking Tom & Friends apps have been downloaded over 12 billion times as of April 2020, reaching 18 billion in March 2022.

Products

Talking Tom & Friends

Games 

 Talking Tom
 Talking Gina the Giraffe
 Talking Ben the Dog
 Talking Tom 2
 Talking Tom & Ben News
 Talking Pierre the Parrot
 Talking Larry the Bird
 Tom's Love Letters
 Tom Loves Angela
 Talking Ginger
 Talking Angela
 Talking Ginger 2
 My Talking Tom
 Talking Santa
 Talking Lila The Fairy
 Talking Ginger & Santa
 My Talking Angela
 Talking Tom Jetski
 Talking Tom Bubble Shooter
 Talking Tom Gold Run
 My Talking Hank
 Talking Angela Color Splash
 Talking Tom Camp
 Talking Tom Pool
 Talking Tom Jetski 2
 Talking Tom Candy Run
 Talking Tom Cake Jump
 Talking Tom Jump Up
 My Talking Tom 2
 Talking Tom Fun Fair
 Talking Tom Hero Dash
 Talking Tom Splash Force
 My Talking Tom Friends
 My Talking Angela 2
 Talking Tom Time Rush

Web series 

 Talking Friends (2012)
 Talking Tom and Friends (2014–present)
 Talking Tom Shorts (2014–present)
 Talking Tom and Friends Minis (2016–18)
 Talking Tom Heroes (2019–present)

Other apps 

 Tiki Tag
 Disco Ant
 Jigty Jelly
 Jigty Jigsaw Puzzles
 Swamp Attack
 Swamp Attack 2
 Mythic Legends

Corporate affairs

Offices 
Outfit7 operates offices in 6 cities in Europe and Asia. The company currently operates in London, Ljubljana, Barcelona, Limassol, Hong Kong and Beijing.

Acquisition and leadership change 
In 2016, Samo and Iza Login hired Goldman Sachs to arrange for a deal to sell their company. On 20 January 2017 it was announced in a press release that Outfit7 was sold to United Luck Holdings Consortium, a China-based group for US$1 billion. However, four days later, another press release indicated that United Luck would sell Outfit7 to a Chinese chemical company, Zhejiang Jinke Peroxide Company, which was renamed to Zhejiang Jinke Entertainment Culture Co. Ltd after it had purchased a Chinese game developer. There was some confusion over who owned Outfit7 given that Jinke had disclosed plans to buy a 10% stake of United Luck. In March 2017, the agreement to sell Outfit7 to Jinke was signed. Samo Login remained on board as company director, and Iza Login remained as an advisor. In July 2018, Xinyu Qian became the CEO.

Logos

References

External links 

 

Video game development companies
Video game companies established in 2009
Talking Tom & Friends
Video game companies of Slovenia
2009 establishments in Slovenia
Mobile game companies
2017 mergers and acquisitions